Dimitrije Krstić was a Serbian basketball player and coach.

Krstić was a member of the first managing board of the Crvena zvezda basketball club.

Playing career 
Godžić played for a Belgrade-based team Crvena zvezda of the Yugoslav First League. During his stint with Crvena zvezda he won two Yugoslav Championships.

Career achievements and awards 
As player
 Yugoslav League champion: 2 (with Crvena zvezda: 1950, 1951).
As coach
Yugoslav Women's League champion: 1 (with Crvena zvezda Ladies: 1963).

References

KK Crvena zvezda players
Serbian men's basketball coaches
Serbian men's basketball players
KK Crvena Zvezda executives
Yugoslav basketball coaches
Yugoslav men's basketball players
ŽKK Crvena zvezda coaches
Year of birth missing
Year of death missing
Place of birth missing
Place of death missing